"Galaxy Song" is a Monty Python song written by Eric Idle and John Du Prez.

The song first appeared in the 1983 film Monty Python's The Meaning of Life and was later released on the album Monty Python Sings. The song was released as a single in the UK on 27 June 1983 when it reached No. 77 in the charts and again on 2 December 1991 as a follow-up to the successful reissue of Always Look on the Bright Side of Life. In 2014 the song was featured in the live stage show Monty Python Live (Mostly) which was followed by another single release on 13 April 2015, this time in collaboration with Stephen Hawking.

Premise and synopsis 

The song originally debuted during the comedy sketch "Live Organ Transplants". The paramedic (John Cleese), upon failing to persuade Mrs. Brown (Terry Jones) to donate her liver, opens the refrigerator doors to reveal a man wearing a pink morning suit (Eric Idle). The man accompanies Mrs. Brown through outer space singing various statistics about the galaxy. The upshot of the song (which follows a synthesized instrumental montage that, in the movie, is accompanied by a computer-animated picture of a woman being impregnated) is that in the grand scheme of the universe, the likelihood of Mrs. Brown's existence was almost zero, but that she should "pray that there's intelligent life somewhere up in space, 'cause there's bugger all down here on Earth". The singer returns to the refrigerator, at which point Mrs. Brown admits that the singer convinced her to hand over her liver.

Accuracy of astronomical figures 

The lyrics include a number of astronomical quantities, the vast majority of which are accurate to within one or two significant figures.  A few statements are only approximately correct or have liberties with definitions, likely to fit within the meter of the song.
 Idle sings that the Earth is "revolving at nine hundred miles an hour". The current estimate for the rotational speed at the equator is 1040 miles/hr (1670 kilometers/hour). 900 miles is correct if this is given in nautical miles, but it is more common to speak of knots in this case. He gives the Earth's orbital speed as  per second, which is accurate to two significant figures.
 Idle states that the Sun is "the source of all our power". In fact, three notable sources of electrical power are not directly traceable to the Sun: The first is geothermal power, which is derived from geothermal energy, 20% of which remains from the original planet formation and 80% of which is derived from ongoing radioactive decay. The second source is the Moon's effects on tides and the associated methods of power generation. The third is nuclear power derived from uranium and other fissile elements. Ultimately, however, the overwhelming proportion of human-generated power derived from fossil fuels and thence from photosynthetic plants makes this line a very good approximation to the truth. The three other power sources are available because of the Sun's influence on our early solar system, so Idle's statement is correct in a literal (if somewhat pedantic) sense, even if not for practical purposes.
 Idle's figures for the size of the Milky Way galaxy are roughly correct. He understates the speed at which the Sun orbits the "galactic central point" by an order of magnitude (12 million miles a day compared to "1 million miles a day"), but he gives an estimate accurate to one significant figure for the total time per orbit. This is "two hundred million years" according to the song, compared with accepted figures of 220 to 250 million years.
 The song says that we are "thirty thousand light years from galactic central point", again correct to within one significant figure of 25,000 light years from the centre of the Milky Way. The song also states that the galaxy is "a hundred thousand light years side to side". This would make the galactic radius 50,000 light years, which is accurate. Australian astrophysicist Bryan Gaensler has stated that Idle's estimation of the thickness of the Milky Way, at 16,000 light years, is more accurate than the official 'textbook' figure of 6,000 light years. However, the song's position on this was later confused by Idle's performance of the song in his Not the Messiah show (2007) where the figure he sings is only 6,000 light years. The reason for the confusion has since been explained in a message from Idle on the official Monty Python website. "There was some smug website pulling apart all my original figures for the song (written circa 1981) so for the 2003 Tour (or maybe 2000) I 'updated' them. Now you tell me I was right all along! Not sure where I got my figures originally but tell the bastards to make up their minds."
 The last verse of the song explains that the universe is expanding, and furthermore, that the speed of light is the "fastest speed there is". Idle's estimate of the speed of light is a relatively accurate one: 12 million miles per minute, versus the standard figure of about 11.16 million miles per minute (11 million would be a closer estimate, but Idle may have chosen "12" simply because the word "11" would not scan so well). Contrary to what the verse implies, the expansion of the universe is not related to the speed of light, and it is in fact expanding much faster.

Remake 

Released in 1984, Jim Post's album Crooner From Outer Space features a remake called "Galaxy/Lighten Up".

"Galaxy Song" was performed by Sharon, Lois & Bram on The Elephant Show and appeared on their album Stay Tuned. (The final line was changed to "Because we need some here on Earth".)

In 1999, Clint Black recorded a remake of "The Galaxy Song" on his album D'lectrified, as well as the "Outside Intro (To Galaxy Song)", which he co-wrote and sang with Idle.

In late 2012, an updated version of "The Galaxy Song" aired on BBC Two in a trailer for Wonders of Life, hosted by physicist Brian Cox. It was called "The Galaxy DNA Song" by Idle.

In 2014, the song was performed in the stage show Monty Python Live (Mostly). Idle emerges from a refrigerator and begins singing to an elderly woman (Carol Cleveland). At one point, they start dancing on stage as a clip shows them dancing among the stars with the galaxy in the background. After the song ends, the show cuts to a clip of Cox at Cambridge discussing the various scientific inaccuracies within the song only to be knocked over by Stephen Hawking with his motorized wheelchair. Hawking tells Cox not to be so pedantic, then starts to sing the song himself. Hawking's cover for the song was released as a Record Store Day single in 2015.

In December 2016, the theme of the song was extended into the hour-long BBC Two The Entire Universe show. Written and co-presented by Idle and Professor Brian Cox, it took the form of a lecture by Cox interspersed with a "comedy and musical extravaganza with the help of Warwick Davis, Noel Fielding, Hannah Waddingham and Robin Ince, alongside a chorus of singers and dancers". The show closed with an ensemble rendition of "The Galaxy Song" with updated figures: the galaxy containing 500 billion stars instead of 100 billion; the galaxy rotation speed of 500,000 mph instead of 40,000; the galaxy thickness as 6,000 ly instead of 16,000, and a spiral arm thickness of 1,000 ly instead of 3,000.

In December 2019, Sabine Hossenfelder (physicist and quantum gravity researcher) covered the song for a YouTube video - retaining many elements of the original Monty Python set in cartoon form.

Parodies and Other Uses 

 Between 1988 and 1991, furniture retailor Courts ran a series of advertisements in the United Kingdom which featured a jingle using the tune of the Galaxy Song sung by a man mimicking Idle's vocal style.
 The "Yakko's Universe" song from the animated show Animaniacs is a homage to the Python's song.
 The "Meaning of Life Space Song" from the animated show the Amazing World of Gumball has many direct references to the Python's song

References

External links 
 A study of the Galaxy song
 Annotations to the Galaxy song
  - sung by physicist Stephen Hawking.

1983 songs
1983 singles
1991 singles
CBS Records singles
MCA Records singles
Monty Python songs
Songs about science
Songs about outer space
Songs written by Eric Idle
Songs written by John Du Prez
Songs written for films